Gymnoglossa transsylvanica is a species of tachinid flies in the genus Gymnoglossa of the family Tachinidae.

References

Tachinidae
Fauna of Romania